Canadian country music artist Terri Clark has released 12 studio albums, 1 live album, 3 compilation albums, 27 music videos and 43 singles. In 1994, she signed her first recording contract with Mercury Nashville Records. Her self-titled debut studio album was released in 1995. Its first three singles became top 10 hits on both the Billboard and Canadian country charts: "Better Things to Do", "When Boy Meets Girl", and "If I Were You". Clark's second studio album Just the Same was released in 1996. "Poor Poor Pitiful Me" was issued as the lead single, peaking at number 5 on the Billboard Hot Country Songs chart. In 1998, Clark's third studio album How I Feel was released. The album spawned four singles including "You're Easy on the Eyes", which topped both the American and Canadian country charts. How I Feel would also become Clark's third album to certify platinum in sales from the RIAA and the MC.

In September 2000, Clark's fourth studio album Fearless was released. Critically acclaimed, the lead single "A Little Gasoline" became a major hit. Pain to Kill (2003) spawned two major hits, including "I Just Wanna Be Mad", which reached number three on the Billboard country chart. In 2004, her first compilation Greatest Hits 1994–2004 was released. The album spawned "Girls Lie Too", which became Clark's second number one country single in the United States. After the release of her next studio album Life Goes On (2005), Clark exited Mercury Records. In 2007, Clark signed with BNA Records, intending to release the studio album In My Next Life. In 2008, Clark left BNA to focus on her career in Canada and the project was shelved. Instead, Clark issued her first live album in 2009, which was followed by her next studio release The Long Way Home. Her next studio album Roots and Wings (2011) was released on her own BareTracks label. Its lead single "Northern Girl" became a top 10 hit on the Canadian country chart. Her tenth studio album Some Songs was issued in 2014, peaking at number 21 on the Canadian Albums Chart. In September 2018, Raising the Bar was released and featured the single "Young as We Are Tonight".

Albums

Studio albums

Compilation albums

Live albums

Singles

As lead artist

As a featured artist

Other charted songs

Videography

Video albums

Music videos

Notes

References

External links
 Terri Clark complete discography at Discogs

Clark, Terri
Clark, Terri
Terri Clark songs
Terri Clark albums